The Sadist (German: "Der Sadist") is a book published by psychiatrist Karl Berg, following the confessions of Peter Kürten, a notorious German serial killer known as both The Vampire of Düsseldorf and the Düsseldorf Monster who committed a series of assaults and murders, primarily between 1929 and 1930.

The book was originally written in German. The first English edition was issued in 1938, by Acorn Press. A second edition was published by William Heinemann Medical Books in 1945.

References 

Non-fiction books about serial killers
Psychology books